NH 137 may refer to:

 National Highway 137 (India)
 New Hampshire Route 137, United States